The Yasuda clan was a Japanese samurai kin group in the Sengoku period and Edo period.

History
The clan was established by Ōe no Hiromoto.

In the Sengoku period, a branch of the Yasuda clan was made responsible for the collection of duties on the cloth trade.

In modern history, the Yasuda are known as a "financial clan" because of their success in banking.

Notable clan leaders 

 Yasuda Zenjiro
 Hajime Yasuda

See also
 Yasuda zaibatsu
 Yoko Ono
 Paul Hisao Yasuda

References

Banking families
Japanese bankers
Japanese business families
Japanese clans